Grozny Airport  is an airport in Chechen Republic, Russia located 7.5 km north of Grozny.

History
First Grozny Airport began its work in 1938, when the aircraft P-5 and U-2 started to be the first postal transportation and sanitary flights. After a while, started to be flying and for agriculture. Until 1977, Grozny airport had only a dirt runway, which could only such aircraft as the Li-2, IL-14, AN-24 and AN-10.

In 1977 was introduced the new airport complex action with artificial runway and basing speed passenger aircraft Tu-134, threw in the Chechen Republic with the regions of the USSR. The new airport was named "Airport North."

Between the years 1990–2000, the airport name was changed several times:

1990 - Sheikh Mansour Airport 
1995 - Airport "North"
1996 - Sheikh Mansour Airport 
2000 - Airport "North"

All infrastructure and airfield Grozny significantly damaged during combat operations against Chechen fighters who seized the airport September 8, 1991 and held it until 30 September 1994. After the end of the war and the beginning of a relatively peaceful life in the country, a gradual recovery airport. In 2000 was created FSI "Directorate for Recovery of Grozny Airport" North "under the leadership of Adnan Gakayeva Vakhidovich in respect of which 1 December 2005-year investigation department of the FSB for the Chechen Republic was prosecuted for embezzlement of funds in particular large scale", aimed at restoring the airport.

During 1999–2006, in the process of rebuilding the airport, the runway was expanded and extended. The airport complex capable of receiving the Tu-154 and IL-62, was rebuilt. The 6 March 2002 Russian Ministry of Transport Decree number AT-76-P launched a full-scale rebuilding of the airport. In 2005, North Airport was renamed Grozny Airport.

On 19 February 2007, the order of FATA number AIO-19 issued certificate of state registration to the Grozny Airport (North). The airport was assigned to class B to gain admission to the reception of Tu-134 aircraft and helicopters of all types, day and night, all year round. On November 29, 2007, Grozny airport was authorized to receive the Tu-154.

On 11 June 2009, the Interstate Aviation Committee (IAC) issued an international aerodrome certificate, therefore the aerodrome was accepted as suitable for international flights service.

Airlines and destinations

References

External links
Nonstop to Chechnya: As War Ebbs, Flights Return The New York Times

Airports built in the Soviet Union
Airports established in 1938
Airports in Chechnya
Airport